Colletes marginatus is a species of solitary bee of the family Colletidae. The female only gather pollen from flowers of the family Fabaceae, including species like Trifolium arvense, Melilotus albus and Melilotus officinalis.

References

Colletidae
Insects described in 1846
Hymenoptera of Europe